Charles Hall (16 October 1842 – unknown) was an English first-class cricketer active 1867 who played in a single match for Middlesex. He was born in Islington and died in (unknown). He was a righthanded batsman and a right-arm fast roundarm bowler.

References

1842 births
Year of death unknown
Date of death unknown
English cricketers
Middlesex cricketers